Dimitriad can refer to:

 Polish–Muscovite War (1605–18), also known as the Dimitriads
 Demetrias or  Demetriada, a community near the Greek city of Volos, founded around 3rd century BC by Demetrius Poliorcetes.